Gary Edward MacDougal (born July 3, 1936) is an American businessman, writer, foundation director, former arts executive, and political leader, who works with governors, legislatures, non-profits and community leaders to assist the economically disadvantaged move from dependency to self-sufficiency.  He is a former partner of McKinsey & Company, an international management consulting firm.  For 18 years Mr. MacDougal was Chairman and Chief Executive of Mark Controls Corporation, a leading manufacturer and installer of building control systems and manufacturer of flow control equipment for the petroleum, chemical and power industries.  Mark Controls grew internally and through acquisitions to become ranked #687 in the Fortune 1000, and listed on the New York Stock Exchange with 5,000 employees around the world.  He is also a founder of the $400 million America for Bulgaria Foundation (Chicago, Illinois and Sofia, Bulgaria) thought to be the largest foundation in Eastern Europe and an Advisory Director of Saratoga Partners, LLC.

Early life
Gary MacDougal was born in Chicago Illinois, attended grade school and the first year of high school in Westfield, New Jersey, completing high school in Los Angeles, California and graduating with a BS in Engineering from the University of California at Los Angeles in 1958. He served in the Navy as the engineering officer on destroyers in the Atlantic fleet for three years before attending Harvard Business School, from which he graduated with distinction in 1963.

Career
MacDougal joined McKinsey & Company in 1963 and was elected a partner in 1968.  While at McKinsey he had responsibility, together with another partner, for the firm’s merger/acquisition and finance practice.  In 1969 he left McKinsey to become CEO of Clayton Mark and Company (name later changed to Mark Controls Corporation).  Prior to Mr. MacDougal’s joining the company it lost money in six of the ten preceding years (1960-1969).  During Mr. MacDougal’s tenure as CEO, investors achieved more than a seventeen fold increase, with the stock rising from $10 per share in 1959 to more than $170 per share in October 1987 (adjusted for splits).  Investors experienced growth of over 17% per year compounded (including dividends) over the eighteen year period. In 1987, he turned over CEO responsibilities to a long-time partner and became honorary chairman of the Board of Mark Controls. MacDougal was a director of United Parcel Service for 34 years where he was chairman of the finance committee, as well as the nominating and governance committees and also served on the board of the following New York Stock Exchange listed corporations:  Union Camp Corporation (forest products), AM International (printing equipment), CBI Industries (industrial construction and commercial gases), Sargent Welch Scientific (laboratory equipment), Maremont Corporation (automotive equipment) and The France Fund (mutual Fund).

Foundations and the arts
MacDougal served as a trustee and chairman of the Russell Sage Foundation (New York), a major funder of social science research, with a primary focus on problems of poverty.  He was for many years a trustee of the Annie E. Casey Foundation with a mission to help move disadvantaged children and families from dependency to self-sufficiency, and is also a former trustee of the W.T. Grant Foundation, working in the area of child development and the problems of disadvantaged children.

The New York City Ballet selected MacDougal as general director in 1990 where, in addition to general management, his activities included leading a long range planning process and establishing a marketing function.

Politics and government
MacDougal chaired the Illinois Governor’s Task Force for Human Services Reform from 1993 to 1997, which developed and implemented a major reorganization of the Illinois human services systems to better integrate services, connect with communities and measure outcomes. This work has been described in columns by Pulitzer Prize winners David Broder and Clarence Page.

MacDougal was appointed by then Vice President George H. W. Bush as assistant campaign manager and senior advisor to his successful 1988 presidential campaign, where he had responsibility in the areas of management, policy and finance. MacDougal was an exploratory candidate for the US Senate from Illinois in 1989, withdrawing at the request of President Bush, and was also a US Senate candidate in 1992 where, according to a book by NY Times journalists Jane Mayer and Jill Abramson, MacDougal’s candidacy was sacrificed by the White House in return for a crucial vote by his opponent, Illinois Senator Alan Dixon (D-IL), to approve Clarence Thomas for the US Supreme Court.  MacDougal served as chairman of the Illinois Republican Party during the 2002 gubernatorial campaign where he rebuilt party finances and earned a reputation for attacking “bipartisan sleaze” in Illinois.

MacDougal was appointed by President George H.W. Bush as a public delegate of the United States to the United Nations for the 44th General Assembly session where, among other responsibilities, he served as liaison to the East Bloc countries. The U.S. Senate confirmed him on November 19, 1989.  President Bush subsequently appointed MacDougal to the US Commission on Improving the Effectiveness of the United Nations.  He also served on the US secretary of labor’s Commission on Workforce Quality and Labor Market Efficiency.

In November 1991, after the Berlin Wall and the Iron Curtain came down, Mr. MacDougal was chosen by President George H.W. Bush to be chairman of the $55 million Bulgarian American Enterprise Fund (BAEF), established to invest in and encourage entrepreneurship and free markets in Bulgaria.  The BAEF created thousands of jobs for Bulgarians, opened up new markets, and grew at a rate in excess of 17% per year to a value of more than $400 million.

Mr. MacDougal is currently founder and chairman emeritus of the America for Bulgaria Foundation (www.us4bg.org), which assumed the BAEF assets.  The ABF, based in Chicago and Sofia, has a mission of strengthening U.S. Bulgaria relations through grants and in the arts; education; archaeology; anti-corruption efforts; Roma education and employment and agricultural productivity.

Writing and speaking
MacDougal is the author of: Make A Difference: A Spectacular Breakthrough in the Fight Against Poverty (St. Martin’s Press: 2000, paperback 2005).  He has published numerous articles on poverty and other topics in the Wall Street Journal, The New York Times, The Washington Post, The Chicago Tribune, The Chicago Sun Times and The Harvard Business Review, among others.  He has spoken on moving people from dependency to self-sufficiency and other topics at leading think tanks and universities including; UCLA, Harvard's Kennedy School, University of Chicago, Northwestern University, Georgetown University, The Brookings Institution, The Heritage Foundation, and The American Enterprise Institute.

Awards and honors
As chief engineer of the USS Cassin Young (DD793), Ensign MacDougal received a letter of commendation as the ship was awarded the Battle Efficiency “E” by the Commander of the Sixth Fleet (Mediterranean) as the outstanding ship in the squadron.  At McKinsey & Company he received the annual Horace Guy Crockett award for the best published article by a McKinsey consultant.  MacDougal was selected “Alumnus of the Year” by the UCLA School of Engineering and Applied Science (SEAS) and was SEAS graduation speaker.  He was also selected as graduation speaker for the Northwestern University Kellogg Graduate School of Management and by UCLA’s College of Arts and Sciences.  Mr. MacDougal was honored with the “President’s Medal” from the President of Bulgaria for his contribution “creating thousands of jobs” and “strengthening ties between Bulgaria and America”.

Personal
MacDougal is married to former Joffrey ballerina, Nureyev partner and Broadway dancer Charlene Gehm.  Charlene graduated with a BA from New York University and an MA in Medieval Studies from Columbia University.  He has two sons, Gary Jr., Principal in The Taurlin Group and Michael, President and CEO of Fiberesin Industries.

He is a member of the Chicago Club, Harvard Club of New York City, the Council on Foreign Relations and the Author’s Guild and is a former Director of the Economic Club of Chicago.

References

1936 births
Living people
American businesspeople
American male writers
Chicago Sun-Times people
Harvard Business School alumni
UCLA Henry Samueli School of Engineering and Applied Science alumni